León XIII is a district of the Tibás canton, in the San José province of Costa Rica.

History 
León XIII was created on 14 March 1994 by Ley 7377.

Geography 
León XIII has an area of  km² and an elevation of  metres.

Demographics 

For the 2011 census, León XIII had a population of  inhabitants.

Transportation

Road transportation 
The district is covered by the following road routes:
 National Route 39

References 

Districts of San José Province
Populated places in San José Province